James Madison Preparatory School (abbreviated as JMPS) is a charter school started in 2000 in Tempe, Arizona. The school was co-founded by brothers Stephen Batchelder and David Batchelder and serves grades 6-12.

History
JMPS was founded by the Batchelder brothers to "challenge committed students with a robust, traditional education emphasizing America’s history and system of government."  The vision the Batchelder brothers were aiming for at James Madison is a Midwestern, traditional education from about 50 years ago, with some positive modern influences sprinkled in. It is a classical liberal arts school which seeks to promote understanding of American history. The school focuses on developing students' understanding of the United States Constitution.

James Madison Preparatory School opened its doors in the fall of 2000.  Fifty-three students showed up on the first day. JMPS had received its charter from the State Charter Board in 1999, having received the highest score ever given for a charter school application up to that time. The first year only 9th, 10th, and 11th graders populated the campus, but by the second year, the school had grown to include 7th, 8th, and 12th graders.

The first graduating class at James Madison Preparatory School was the Class of 2002, which only had four graduates.  The largest graduating class was the Class of 2012, which had 31 graduates.

Academics
JMPS was ranked as an "Excelling" school in Arizona for the 2008-2009 school year based on AIMS test results.

JMPS offers English Grammar, Civics, American History (one year in junior high and two full years in high school), World History, Geography, Algebra, Geometry, Astronomy, Economics, Biology, Latin, Chemistry, Calculus, Geology, Western Philosophy, Physics, Physical Education, Political Science, Fine Arts, Composition, and Literature. Also included in their curriculum are a few courses designed to provide students with real world, practical life skills.  Balancing a checkbook, living within a budget, paying taxes, shopping for insurance, cooking a meal, changing a car tire, and sewing on a button are among the many varied skills that students are exposed to in "self-reliance" classes.

School culture and student government
JMPS has a dress code for students, emphasizing business attire such as slacks, dress shoes, and a polo or oxford shirt.

All students are required to participate in a daily chore at the end of each school day, where the students perform minor routine maintenance on the campus such as taking out classroom trash, vacuuming classrooms, and cleaning bathroom windows. The daily chore is scheduled to take between 5 and 10 minutes.

JMPS has a student-run high school government modeled after the American three-branch system of government.
 Each year, the school holds an election to decide on the next year's student government president, who then appoints a student  cabinet to help manage student affairs, including student fundraisers to fund events such as school dances.
 The Student President also nominates students to serve on a student Supreme Court, which judges and sentences minor student misconduct cases. Up to nine students may serve on the student court, for terms of up to two years. Students may be re-appointed when their terms end.
 Students are placed into homerooms, where they decide on two representatives (for each homeroom) to the school's Student Senate, which votes on Cabinet and Court appointments. The remaining students are encouraged to be involved in the Student House of Representatives, which votes on bills introduced to aid in student government.

A junior high student council was installed in 2007 as a liaison between junior high students and the high school government.

Houses 
Students at Madison Prep are placed into "houses," which are also called "homerooms" or "advisor groups." The high school has ten houses, and the junior high has four.  Each house holds approximately 17 students, and one faculty member is assigned to every house.  The faculty advisor serves as the contact person between the school and the parents. The advisors work with the students in their group to help guide them through their academic career and their practical college preparation.

All houses compete with each other for house points throughout the school year to earn the honor of being Top House.  House points are earned in a wide variety of ways, and a scoreboard that shows the current standings is kept up in the front office.

Clubs 
JMPS students in 8-12th grade are given the opportunity to select one club-class first and second trimester. A trimester club-class meets for two class periods a week and is worth half a credit for high school students (two in total each year). There is a variety of clubs offered such as Anime Club, Art Club, Chess Club, Choreography Club, Debate Club, Improv Club, Student Newspaper, Health and First-Aid Club, Yearbook, Weight Training Club, Archery Club, Quidditch Club, and Spanish Club. Students can also decide to be in study hall, but are not awarded the half credit for this.

Academic Decathlon Team 

JMPS offers the Academic Decathlon Team as a club-class. As a club-class, the students earn academic credit for their participation. 

The season runs during the 1st and 2nd trimesters.

The team members consist of three "A" students, three "B" students and three "C" students, as well as one alternate for each of the three grade groups. The students compete as individuals, winning individual gold, silver and bronze medals, and their scores count toward an overall team score.  Winning teams move on to state and national competitions.  Each student competes in the following ten academic events: art, economics, essay, interview, language and literature, mathematics, music, science, social science and speech.  The final event of the day is the Super Quiz in which the entire team competes in a game-show type setting in front of an audience of family and friends.

Athletics
All sports teams participate in the Canyon Athletic Association. The school participates in:
 Fall: football, girls' volleyball, Sparx (dance line), Ultimate Frisbee, cross country
Winter: girls' and boys' basketball
Spring: coed soccer, track and field, boys' baseball, girls' softball

Fine arts

Fine arts programs include a choir, string section and a rock band. These perform rehearsed pieces at school concerts, and are open to any students interested in joining them. The presence of these groups on campus is determined entirely by student interest.

JMPS also fields a student drumline and color guard, which practice during the fall and perform at football games for JMPS. Each year they hold a performance called "Glownight," which is followed by a bonfire led by the seniors.

JMPS also puts on several theatrical productions, including:
 A fall/winter play (open to audition for grades 9-12)
 A spring musical (open to audition for grades 7-12)
 A spring production performed by the 8th grade

References

External links
 James Madison Preparatory School

Public high schools in Arizona
Education in Tempe, Arizona
Educational institutions established in 2000
Schools in Maricopa County, Arizona
Charter schools in Arizona
2000 establishments in Arizona